Marcelo Gomes Soares (born March 9, 1982) is a Brazilian football player who currently plays for São Caetano.

Club statistics

References

External links

1982 births
Living people
Brazilian footballers
Brazilian expatriate footballers
Associação Atlética Ponte Preta players
Guaratinguetá Futebol players
Sampaio Corrêa Futebol Clube players
Associação Desportiva São Caetano players
Esporte Clube XV de Novembro (Piracicaba) players
J2 League players
Vegalta Sendai players
Expatriate footballers in Japan
Association football forwards
People from Maceió
Sportspeople from Alagoas